John Mercer  (21 February 1791 – 30 November 1866) was an English dye and fabric chemist and fabric printer born in Great Harwood, Lancashire. In 1844 he developed a process for treating cotton, mercerisation, that improves many of its qualities for use in fabrics.

Biography
John Mercer never went to school; he learned basic reading and writing from his neighbour. He was very fond of dyeing and experimented to find new methods. 
With the help of a textbook he taught himself the chemistry of dyes. In 1817, he discovered Antimony orange, the first good orange pigment available for cotton-fabric printing.
He developed the  mercerisation process in 1844, and was admitted to the Royal Society, the Philosophical Society and the Chemical Society.

Mercer pioneered research into antimicrobials, preventing the spread of cholera in Sykeside in 1847 with chloride of lime, or "calcium hypochlorite", which is today used to disinfect public swimming pools and drinking water.

In 1814 he married Mary Wolstenholme; together they had six children. His wife died in 1859 and he afterwards became a juror to the second Great Exhibition in 1862, and a justice of the peace in Lancashire, continuing to give lectures at Clayton-le-Moors and supporting local Anglican and Methodist churches.

The 1861 census records him as a 70-year-old "Chymist", living with his son John and 12 others at 29 Burlington Hotel, London (Florence Nightingale was next door, at No. 30). Mercer died at home in 1866 and was buried in St Bartholomew's Church, Great Harwood. Funds for his commemoration were provided by his daughter Maria, and a clock tower was unveiled in Great Harwood in 1903, as well as the Mercer Hall. Mercer's cottage at Oakenshaw, Clayton-le-Moors was donated to be a museum and park.

References

Further reading
E. A. Parnell, The life and labours of John Mercer (1886)
R. S. Crossley, Accrington: captains of industry (1930)
A. Nieto-Galan, ‘Calico printing and chemical knowledge in Lancashire in the early 19th century: the life and "colours" of John Mercer’, Annals of Science, 54 (1997), 1–28
A. W. Baldwin, ‘Mercer and mercerization’, Endeavour, 3 (1944), 138–43

External links
Biography and pictures about John Mercer

1791 births
1866 deaths
People from Great Harwood
Fellows of the Royal Society
English chemists
English printers
Manchester Literary and Philosophical Society
19th-century English businesspeople